This is the list of Olympic medalists from African countries:

Athletics

Boxing

Canoeing

Cycling

Diving

Fencing

Field hockey

Football

Judo

Rowing

Rugby 7s

Shooting

Swimming

Taekwondo

Tennis

Triathlon

Weightlifting

Wrestling

See also
Lists of Olympic medalists
All-time Olympic Games medal table
Sport in Africa

External links
IOC results

Sport in Africa
Lists of Olympic medalists